Roccellodea is a genus of lichenized fungi in the family Roccellaceae; according to the 2007 Outline of Ascomycota, the placement in this family is uncertain. A monotypic genus, it contains the single species Roccellodea nigerrima.

References

Roccellaceae
Lichen genera
Monotypic Ascomycota genera
Taxa named by Otto Vernon Darbishire
Taxa described in 1932